The 1981 Eastern 8 Conference Baseball Championship Series was held on May 8 and 9, 1981 to determine the champion of the NCAA Division I Eastern 8 Conference, renamed in 1982 as the Atlantic 10 Conference, for the 1981 NCAA Division I baseball season. This was the third iteration of the event, and was held on the campus of George Mason in Fairfax, Virginia.  won the championship.

Format and seeding
The regular season winners of each of the conference's two divisions advanced to a best of three series.

Results
Game One

Game Two

Notes 
 Rutgers 25 runs are a tournament record.

References

Championship Series
Atlantic 10 Conference Baseball Tournament
Eastern 8 Conference Baseball Championship Series
Eastern 8 Conference Baseball Championship Series
Baseball in Washington, D.C.
College sports in Washington, D.C.
Sports competitions in Washington, D.C.